Robert Wodmanston (fl. 1460s) was a Canon of Windsor from 1468 to 1469.

Career

He was appointed:
Prebendary of St Mary in the Castle, Hastings 1469

He was appointed to the eighth stall in St George's Chapel, Windsor Castle in 1468 and held the canonry until 1469.

Notes 

Canons of Windsor